Ecklonia maxima, or sea bamboo, is a species of kelp native to the southern oceans. It is typically found along the southern Atlantic coast of Africa, from the very south of South Africa to northern Namibia.

The kelp anchors itself by attaching itself to a rock or other kelp via its holdfast. From this root-like structure a single long stipe rises to the surface waters, where a large pneumatocyst keeps a tangle of blades at the surface to aid photosynthesis.

The species is of economic importance as it is harvested for both an agricultural supplement and as food for farmed abalone.

References

maxima